Pedicellarum is a monotypic genus of flowering plants in the family Araceae. The single species that comprises the genus is Pedicellarum paiei. This species is endemic to the Island of Borneo.

References

Pothoideae
Monotypic Araceae genera
Endemic flora of Borneo